The Canton of Saint-Martin-de-Ré is a French former administrative division located in Île de Ré, Charente-Maritime, Poitou-Charentes. It was disbanded following the French canton reorganisation which came into effect in March 2015. It consisted of 5 communes, which joined the new Canton of Île de Ré in 2015. Its chef-lieu was Saint-Martin-de-Ré. It had 13,196 inhabitants (2012).

Geography 
The canton was bordered by the pertuis Breton to the north, by the "strait of La Pallice" to the east and the sluice of Antioch to the south. To the west, it adjoined the canton of Ars-en-Ré by the commune of La Couarde-sur-Mer. Its altitude varied all the way from 0 m (La Flotte) to 17 m (Le Bois-Plage-en-Ré) with an average altitude of 8 m (about 8.8 yards high). The nature of its soil as the geology of the island are of the same origin than the one of Aunis, whose Île de Ré represents the western extension.

Administration 
 
The canton was located in the eastern part of Île de Ré and belonged to the arrondissement of La Rochelle. Its chef-lieu was the small port town of Saint-Martin-de-Ré. The canton comprised the following communes:
Le Bois-Plage-en-Ré
La Flotte
Rivedoux-Plage
Sainte-Marie-de-Ré
Saint-Martin-de-Ré

Politics 
List of the general councillors (conseillers généraux) since 1906:

Elections: results (1979-2011)

2011

2004

1998

1992

1985

1979

References

Saint-Martin-de-Re
2015 disestablishments in France
States and territories disestablished in 2015
Île de Ré